Charles Anderson Rhodes (April 7, 1885 – October 26, 1918) was a professional baseball player who played pitcher in the Major Leagues from 1906 to 1909. Rhodes played for the St. Louis Cardinals and Cincinnati Reds.

External links

1885 births
1918 deaths
St. Louis Cardinals players
Cincinnati Reds players
Major League Baseball pitchers
Baseball players from Kansas
Parsons Preachers players
Trenton Tigers players
Omaha Rourkes players
Little Rock Travelers players
Chattanooga Lookouts players
Fort Worth Panthers players
Austin Senators players
Galveston Pirates players
San Antonio Bronchos players
People from Caney, Kansas